Devon Jamerson (born 27 August 1988), is an international soccer player from Trinidad and Tobago who plays professionally for Ma Pau as a midfielder.

External links
Soca Warriors

1988 births
Living people
Trinidad and Tobago footballers
Trinidad and Tobago international footballers

Association football midfielders